ISO 3166-2:MM is the entry for Myanmar in ISO 3166-2, part of the ISO 3166 standard published by the International Organization for Standardization (ISO), which defines codes for the names of the principal subdivisions (e.g., provinces or states) of all countries coded in ISO 3166-1.

As of 2020, Myanmar ISO 3166-2 codes are defined for 7 regions, 7 states, and 1 union territory.

Each code consists of two parts, separated by a hyphen. The second part is two digits:
 01–07: regions
 11–17: states
 18: union territory

Current codes
Subdivision names are listed as in the ISO 3166-2 standard published by the ISO 3166 Maintenance Agency (ISO 3166/MA).

Click on the button in the header to sort each column.

Changes
The following changes to the entry have been announced in newsletters by the ISO 3166/MA since the first publication of ISO 3166-2 in 1998:

See also
 Subdivisions of Myanmar
 FIPS region codes of Myanmar

External links
 ISO Online Browsing Platform: MM
 Divisions of Myanmar, Statoids.com

2:MM
ISO 3166-2
Myanmar geography-related lists